Ignatius was a Patriarch of the Bulgarian Orthodox Church in the 13th century during the rule of Emperor Konstantin Tih (r. 1257–1277). He is listed as the fourth Patriarch presiding over the Bulgarian Church from Tarnovo in the medieval Book of Boril.

The name of Ignatius is linked to the firm position of the Bulgarian Church to maintain the purity of Orthodoxy during the Second Council of Lyon in 1272–1274. In the council the Byzantine Emperor Michael VIII Palaeologus and the Ecumenical Patriarchate of Constantinople were inclined for a union between the Eastern and the Western Churches in order to avoid war with Charles I of Naples. They also demanded the liquidation of the Bulgarian Patriarchate. Patriarch Ignatius decisively opposed those moves and was called a "pillar of Orthodoxy".

From that period dates the idea in medieval Bulgarian literature that the capital of the Bulgarian Empire Tarnovo was a "New Constantinople" (i.e. Third Rome). The city was called in literary works Tsarevgrad Tarnov – the Imperial city of Tarnovo, after the Bulgarian name of Constantinople Tsarigrad.

References

Sources 
 
 

13th-century deaths
13th-century Bulgarian people
Patriarchs of Bulgaria
People from Veliko Tarnovo